Olene dudgeoni is a moth of the subfamily Lymantriinae first described by Charles Swinhoe in 1907. It is found from the north-eastern Himalayas to Indochina, Taiwan and Sundaland.

The wingspan is 30–38 mm. Adults are on wing in January, April and May.

References

Moths described in 1907
Lymantriinae